Gordon Phillip "Joe" Allen (April 29, 1929 – December 23, 2010) was a Democratic member of the North Carolina General Assembly and an insurance professional from Roxboro, North Carolina.

After graduating from Mars Hill College, Allen served in the United States Army during the Korean War and then served in the North Carolina National Guard.

Allen was elected to three terms in the North Carolina Senate, serving from the beginning of 1969 through the end of 1974. In just his second term, Allen rose to the highest rank of Senate leadership when he was elected President Pro Tem and simultaneously Majority Leader. He was re-elected to a second term as Senate leader for the 1973–1974 General Assembly.

After leaving the legislature, Allen spent 20 years lobbying for the N.C. Bankers Association. Then, he was elected to the North Carolina House of Representatives in 1997, serving until 2005. He represented the state's fifty-fifth House district, including constituents in Orange and Person counties.

Allen was also the first chairman of the board of trustees for Piedmont Community College and later
received the Order of the Long Leaf Pine in 2010.

He was a father of five children and grandfather of seventeen grandchildren. One granddaughter was named Rachael Gordon after her grandfather.

References

External links

|-

|-

|-

|-

1929 births
2010 deaths
Democratic Party members of the North Carolina House of Representatives
Democratic Party North Carolina state senators
United States Army personnel of the Korean War
Mars Hill University alumni
21st-century American politicians